Reniță is a Moldovan surname. Notable people with the surname include:

 Alecu Reniță (born 1954), Moldovan politician
 Iurie Reniță (born 1958), Moldovan politician and diplomat

See also
 Renita

Surnames of Moldovan origin